The Chile women's national rugby union sevens team is a Rugby sevens national women's side that represents Chile. 

At the 2022 South America Women's Sevens Championship, Chile finished fifth overall.

Tournament history

World Rugby Sevens Challenger Series
2022 - 10th

Pan American Games
Santiago 2023 - Qualified as hosts

South American Games
2014 - 6th

South American Championship
2004 - 6th
2005 - 5th
2007 - 5th
2008 - 6th
2009 - 6th
2010 - 5th
2011 - 3rd
2012 - 5th
2013 - 6th
2015 - 6th
2016 - 6th
2017 (Villa Carlos Paz) - 6th
2017 (Montevideo) - 6th
2018 - 5th
2019 (Asunción) - 3rd
2019 (Lima) - 6th
2019 (Montevideo) - 6th
2020 - 6th
2021 - 6th
2022 - 5th

Team

Challenger Series 2022

See also
Chile national rugby sevens team

References

Women's national rugby sevens teams
Rugby union in Chile
R
Chile national rugby union team